Sultan Murat II Mosque is the biggest mosque in Rožaje and the biggest mosque in Montenegro. It was built at the same time as the nearby fortress by the Sultan of the Ottoman Empire, Murat II in 1450. It was rebuilt in 2008.

Reconstructions
Primarily, it was built in the style of old houses in Rožaje in 1450 and then reconstructed by the Islamic Council in 1967.

Present form
In 2005, the ambassador of Turkey in Serbia and Montenegro  donated 65.000€ to the President of the municipality of Rožaje for the reconstruction of the Sultan Murat II Mosque.

See also
Kučanska Mosque
Hfz. Abdurahman Kujević
Immovable cultural property of Rožaje

References

External links
Saša-Abdulah Tolić prešao u Islam i preselio se iz Čačka u Rožaje
Džematski iftar u haremu džamije Sultana Murata II u Rožajama
U džamiji Sultan Murat II u Rožajama hutbu održao Ismail ef. Dacić
Mukabela propraćena video projekcijom

Sultan Murat II Mosque
Ottoman architecture in Montenegro